The 1954 12 Hours of Sebring (officially the Florida International 12-Hour Grand Prix of Endurance ) was a motor race for sports cars, staged on 7 March 1954 at the Sebring International Raceway, Florida, United States. It was the second race of the 1954 World Sportscar Championship and was the fourth 12 Hours of Sebring. The race was won by Bill Lloyd and Stirling Moss driving an Osca MT4 1450.

Report

Entry

A grand total 89 sports cars were entered for this event, of which only 63 arrived for practice. The race was supported by the work of teams of Scuderia Lancia, running four cars, the Aston Martin running three cars and the Austin-Healey team consisting of four cars, only one of which was a factory entry, under the name of Donald Healey Ltd., the others entered by private individuals.  The three work's Lancia D24’s in particular were entered for – Juan Manuel Fangio and Eugenio Castellotti, Piero Taruffi and Robert Manzon and Alberto Ascari and Luigi Villoresi, were in a class of their own.

The factory Ferrari entries did not materialize, in order to defend their championship lead, but the private entries of Bill Spear and Briggs Cunningham were on hand. Likewise, there was no Jaguar factory team, but eight Jaguars were listed on the entry.

Some of the race participants who also were noted in other fields of endeavor included ex-US congressman  Jim Simpson, “international playboy” Porfirio Rubirosa, and, fresh from finishing second in the Buenos Aires 1000km, Marquis de Portago – well known equestrian at the time and also a high ranking Spanish nobility.

Practice

It became obvious during Friday practice sessions that the race would be between the Ferraris and Lancias. The Lancia D24s lapped the 5.2 mile circuit in three minutes 38 seconds and on the Saturday, Cunningham's Ferrari 375 MM made it in 3m 31sec. Another of Cunningham cars, an Osca MT4 1450 piloted by young English driver, Stirling Moss with his partnered Bill Lloyd, turned in lap on Friday of, 3m 56 secs, although this small engined car, no one considered this car a real threat the Lancias.

Race

The race was held over 12 hours on the 5.2 miles Sebring International Raceway. The early morning rain cleared to leave a cold, windy but dry day. However, throughout the race, the strong wind blowing directly out of the north created a nasty crosswind on the fast back stretch.

With the race starting promptly at 10am, 59 cars scrambled for positions. Cunningham in his own Cunningham C-4R was the first across the line, but was soon headed by Erwin Goldschmidt in his Allard-Cadillac J2R. However, before the end of lap one, the three Lancias, of Fangio, Ascari and Taruffi had sorted themselves out and headed the field, running one, two and three with Spear's Ferrari close behind. The Cunningham Ferrari of Phil Walters, stopped for a replacement spark plug and lost several minutes. Moss was keeping the bigger cars on their toes holding down 4th.

Around mid-distance, trouble hits Spear's Ferrari, crippled by a broken oil seal. Last year's winner's, John Fitch and Walters, in their Ferrari had been marking up time, and with Spear's retirement, the only threat to the flying Lancias. Fitch and Walters had been pushing the car hard, and this too would not finish, going out late afternoon with a bad connecting rod bearing.

As darkness fell on the former Hendricks Army Airfield, the Lancias of Ascari and Villoresi, and Fangio and Castellotti had retired due to brakes and gearbox issues respectively, leaving the burden on the shoulders of Taruffi and Manzon. This D24, was still lapping swiftly on the now night-blackened circuit, at an average speed of 82 mph – more than seven mph faster than the 1953 record-breaking Cunningham C-4R – albeit with only one headlight. As Taruffi and Manzon streaked out of sight, chief race steward, Alec Ulmann announced that the Lancia would be black-flagged if it continued to race with just one light. The team's race director, Attilio Pasquarelli put out a red flag, and leaned far out onto the course to block the car's path.  When the car finally pitted, Manzon protested: “The car wouldn’t go any faster – oil pressure was off”. He thought the red flag was a pit signal that their lead was in danger.

Despite, as Moss said, the Lancias were “wiping the floor with the rest of us”, Lloyd and Moss soon took advantage of the Osca's beautiful handling, by throwing the car sideways, into the corners to scrub off as much speed as they started to countering the high brake wear.

The three Aston Martins had retired quite early  and the leading Lancia D24 being driven by Manzon, stopped on the circuit with engine trouble an hour from the end of the race. Manzon returned to the pits on foot, but co-driver Taruffi acted to push the car for the mile and a half back to the pits. The Lancia was finally pushed across the finish line but was disqualified and the Osca, driven by Moss and Lloyd, won the race. The Osca survived a slightly suspect clutch and a tremendous rain storm to take a totally unexpected win. They covered 168 laps (873.6 miles), averaging a speed of 72.800 mph. Second place went to the Lancia D24 of Porfirio Rubirosa and Gino Valenzano, albeit five laps adrift. Third place was awarded to the Austin-Healey 100 entered by Donald Healey and driven by Lance Macklin and George Huntoon.

Although there were no fatalities during the race, James Brundage, died in Fort Lauderdale, Florida on his way home when the Allard he was driving hit a tree.

Official Classification

Class Winners are in Bold text.

 Fastest Lap: Alberto Ascari, 3:32.0secs (88.302 mph)

Class Winners

Standings after the race

References

Further reading

Alec Ulmann. The Sebring Story. Chilton Book Company. ASIN B0006CUAP2.

12 Hours of Sebring
Sebring
Sebring
Sebring
Sebring